Matus Kostur (born March 28, 1980) is a Slovak former professional ice hockey goaltender. He was selected by the New Jersey Devils in the 5th round (164th overall) of the 2000 NHL Entry Draft.

Kostur made his Kontinental Hockey League debut playing with HC Dinamo Minsk debut during the 2008–09 KHL season.

References

External links

1980 births
Living people
Albany River Rats players
Augusta Lynx players
HC '05 Banská Bystrica players
Columbus Cottonmouths (ECHL) players
HC Dinamo Minsk players
Sportovní Klub Kadaň players
GKS Katowice (ice hockey) players
Keramin Minsk players
New Jersey Devils draft picks
HK Nitra players
Sportspeople from Banská Bystrica
Piráti Chomutov players
HK Poprad players
HK Riga 2000 players
HC Shakhtyor Soligorsk players
Slovak ice hockey goaltenders
HKM Zvolen players
Slovak expatriate ice hockey players in the United States
Slovak expatriate ice hockey players in the Czech Republic
Slovak expatriate sportspeople in Poland
Expatriate ice hockey players in Poland
Slovak expatriate sportspeople in Belarus
Expatriate ice hockey players in Belarus
Slovak expatriate sportspeople in Latvia
Expatriate ice hockey players in Latvia